Black Orpheus (Portuguese: Orfeu Negro ) is a 1959 romantic tragedy film directed by French filmmaker Marcel Camus, and starring Marpessa Dawn and Breno Mello. It is based on the play Orfeu da Conceição by Vinicius de Moraes, which set the Greek legend of Orpheus and Eurydice in a contemporary favela in Rio de Janeiro during Carnaval. The film was an international co-production among companies in Brazil, France and Italy.

The film is particularly noted for its soundtrack by two Brazilian composers: Antônio Carlos Jobim, whose song "A felicidade" opens the film; and Luiz Bonfá, whose "Manhã de Carnaval" and "Samba de Orfeu" have become classics of bossa nova. The songs performed by Orfeu were dubbed by singer Agostinho dos Santos. Lengthy passages of filming took place in the Morro da Babilônia, a favela in the Leme neighbourhood of Rio de Janeiro.

Black Orpheus won the Palme d'Or at the 1959 Cannes Film Festival, the 1960 Academy Award for Best Foreign Language Film, the 1960 Golden Globe Award for Best Foreign Film and was nominated for the 1961 BAFTA Award for Best Film.

While the 1959 adaptation has been celebrated internationally, it has been criticized by Brazilians and scholars for exoticizing Brazil for an international audience and reinforcing harmful stereotypes.

Plot
A marble Greek bas relief explodes to reveal Afro-Brazilian men dancing the samba to drums in a favela. Eurydice (Marpessa Dawn) arrives in Rio de Janeiro, and takes a trolley driven by Orfeu (Breno Mello). New to the city, she rides to the end of the line, where Orfeu introduces her to the station guard, Hermes (Alexandro Constantino), who gives her directions to the home of her cousin Serafina (Léa Garcia).

Although engaged to Mira (Lourdes de Oliveira), Orfeu is not very enthusiastic about the upcoming marriage. The couple go to get a marriage license. When the clerk at the courthouse hears Orfeu's name, he jokingly asks if Mira is Eurydice, annoying her. Afterward, Mira insists on getting an engagement ring. Though Orfeu has just been paid, he would rather use his money to get his guitar out of the pawn shop for Carnival. Mira finally offers to loan Orfeu the money to buy her ring.

When Orfeu goes home, he is pleased to find Eurydice staying next door with Serafina. Eurydice has run away to Rio to hide from a strange man who she believes wants to kill her. The man – Death dressed in a stylized skeleton costume – finds her, but Orfeu gallantly chases him away. Orfeu and Eurydice fall in love, yet are constantly on the run from both Mira and Death. When Serafina's sailor boyfriend Chico (Waldemar De Souza) shows up, Orfeu offers to let Eurydice sleep in his home, while he takes the hammock outside. Eurydice invites him to her bed, and they make love.

Orfeu, Mira, and Serafina are the principal members of a samba school, one of many parading during Carnival. Serafina decides to have Eurydice dress in her Queen if the Night costume so that she can spend more time with Chico. A veil conceals Eurydice's face; only Orfeu is told of the deception. During the parade, Orfeu dances with Eurydice rather than Mira.

Eventually, Mira spots Serafina among the spectators and rips off Eurydice's veil. Eurydice is forced once again to run for her life first from Mira, then from Death. Trapped in Orfeu's own trolley station, she hangs from a power line to get away from Death and is killed accidentally by Orfeu when he turns the power on and electrocutes her. Death tells Orfeu "Now she's mine," before knocking him out.

Distraught, Orfeu looks for Eurydice at the Office of Missing Persons, although Hermes has told him she is dead. The building is deserted at night, with only a janitor sweeping up. He tells Orfeu that the place holds only papers and that no people can be found there. Taking pity on Orfeu, the janitor takes him down a large darkened spiral staircase – a reference to the mythical Orpheus' descent into the underworld – to a Macumba ritual, a regional form of the Afro-Brazilian religion Candomblé.

At the gate, they pass a guard dog named Cerberus. During the ritual, the janitor tells Orfeu to call to his beloved by singing. The spirit of Eurydice inhabits the body of an old woman and speaks to him. Orfeu wants to gaze upon her, but Eurydice begs him not to lest he lose her forever. When he turns and looks anyway, he sees the old woman, and Eurydice's spirit departs, as in the Greek myth.

Orfeu wanders in mourning. He retrieves Eurydice's body from the city morgue and carries her in his arms across town and up the hill toward his home, where his shack is burning. A vengeful Mira flings a stone that hits him in the head and knocks him over a cliff to his death, with Eurydice still in his arms.

Two children, Benedito and Zeca – who have followed Orfeu throughout the film – believe Orfeu's tale that his guitar playing causes the sun to rise every morning. After Orfeu's death, Benedito insists that Zeca pick up the guitar and play so that the sun will rise. Zeca plays, and the sun comes up. A little girl appears, gives Zeca a single flower, and the three children dance.

Cast

 Breno Mello as Orfeu
 Marpessa Dawn as Eurydice
 Marcel Camus as Ernesto
 Fausto Guerzoni as Fausto
 Lourdes de Oliveira as Mira
 Léa Garcia as Serafina
 Adhemar da Silva as Death
 Alexandro Constantino as Hermes
 Waldemar De Souza as Chico
 Jorge Dos Santos as Benedito
 Aurino Cassiano as Zeca

Notes
 Marpessa Dawn was not from Brazil, but from Pittsburgh, Pennsylvania.
 Breno Mello was a soccer player with no acting experience at the time he was cast as Orfeu. Mello was walking on the street in Rio de Janeiro, when director Marcel Camus stopped him and asked if he would like to be in a film.
 Da Silva, the actor who played Death, was a triple jumper who won two Olympic gold medals, in 1952 and 1956.
 The role of Zeca was played by Aurino Cassiano, a young musician from a large musical family. With brother Amaury on cavaquinho and Aurino on pandeiro, they performed in the streets, calling themselves "Dupla Chuvisco". In 1957, they were invited to perform in a film, Pega Ladrão, and then Aurino appeared in another, Vai que é Mole. It was during the filming of Vai que é Mole that Marcel Camus saw Aurino performing on location, and invited him to test for Black Orpheus.

Reception

Exoticizing gaze 
The Palme d'Or and Oscar-winning film was celebrated internationally and criticized in Brazil; Vinicius de Moraes, author of the play Orfeu da Conceição upon which the film was based, was outraged by the film and left the theater in the middle of the screening. The adaptation by Marcel Camus reinforced various stereotypes about Brazilian culture and society and about Afro-Brazilians specifically, portraying the characters as "simple-minded, overtly sexual, and interested only in singing and dancing." Setting out to make itself more "appealing" to foreign audiences, the film resorts to a "cheap and problematic exoticism" of Brazil.

Aggregated reviews 
On Rotten Tomatoes, the film holds a rating of 87% from 70 reviews with the consensus: "Colorful, atmospheric, and infectious, Black Orpheus takes an ancient tale and makes it fresh anew, thanks in part to its bewitching bossa nova soundtrack."

Awards and honors
Black Orpheus won the Palme d'Or at the 1959 Cannes Film Festival, the 1960 Academy Award for Best Foreign Language Film, the 1960 Golden Globe Award for Best Foreign Film and was nominated for the 1961 BAFTA Award for Best Film. In the last case, Brazil was credited together with France and Italy. In July 2021, the film was shown in the Cannes Classics section at the 2021 Cannes Film Festival.

Influence
Black Orpheus was cited by Jean-Michel Basquiat as one of his early musical influences, while Barack Obama notes in his memoir Dreams from My Father (1995) that it was his mother's favorite film. Obama, however, did not share his mother's preferences upon first watching the film during his first years at Columbia University: "I suddenly realized that the depiction of the childlike blacks I was now seeing on the screen, the reverse image of Conrad's dark savages, was what my mother had carried with her to Hawaii all those years before, a reflection of the simple fantasies that had been forbidden to a white, middle-class girl from Kansas, the promise of another life: warm, sensual, exotic, different."

The film's soundtrack also inspired Vince Guaraldi's 1962 album Jazz Impressions of Black Orpheus.

As a child, Bong Joon-ho watched the film on Korean television and it made a big impact on him.

Arcade Fire's fourth studio album Reflektor featured themes linked and inspired by the film.

See also
 Orfeu, 1999 film adapted from the same source material
 List of submissions to the 32nd Academy Awards for Best Foreign Language Film
 List of French submissions for the Academy Award for Best Foreign Language Film

References

External links 

Culture Vulture review of Black Orpheus
Black Orpheus an essay by David Ehrenstein at the Criterion Collection
Black Orpheus: Dancing in the Streets an essay by Michael Atkinson at the Criterion Collection

1950s fantasy films
1959 films
Best Foreign Language Film Academy Award winners
Bossa nova albums
Brazilian comedy-drama films
Brazilian musical films
Films based on classical mythology
Films directed by Marcel Camus
Films set in Rio de Janeiro (city)
Films shot in Rio de Janeiro (city)
French comedy-drama films
Orpheus
Palme d'Or winners
1950s Portuguese-language films
Romantic fantasy films
1959 comedy-drama films
Brazilian films based on plays
Films scored by Antônio Carlos Jobim
Italian comedy-drama films
1950s Italian films
1950s French films